Laminin subunit beta-3 is a protein that in humans is encoded by the LAMB3 gene.

LAMB3 encodes the beta 3 subunit of laminin. Laminin is composed of three subunits (alpha, beta, and gamma), and refers to a family of basement membrane proteins. For example, LAMB3 serves as the beta chain in laminin-5. Mutations in LAMB3 have been identified as the cause of various types of epidermolysis bullosa. Two alternatively spliced transcript variants encoding the same protein have been found for this gene.

References

Further reading

Laminins